Dudziak is a surname. Notable people with the surname include:

Jeremy Dudziak (born 1995), German footballer
Marian Dudziak (born 1941), Polish sprinter 
Mary L. Dudziak, American legal theorist
Urszula Dudziak (born 1943), Polish jazz vocalist

Polish-language surnames